Socialist Democratic Union (Greek: Σοσιαλιστική Δημοκρατική Ένωση) was one of the many anti-dictatorial struggle groups that fought against the Greek military junta of 1967-1974. The Socialist Democratic Union organized and mobilized Greeks working and studying in Western Europe against the colonel's junta.

Among the founders of the group was former President of the Hellenic Republic Karolos Papoulias.

See also
 History of Modern Greece
 Greek military junta of 1967-1974

Resistance to the Greek junta